Slungård is a Norwegian surname. Notable people with the surname include:

Anne Kathrine Slungård (born 1964), Norwegian politician
Torstein Slungård (1931–2009), Norwegian politician

Norwegian-language surnames